The Upper Canada Rebellion was an insurrection against the oligarchic government of the British colony of Upper Canada (present-day Ontario) in December 1837. While public grievances had existed for years, it was the rebellion in Lower Canada (present-day Quebec), which started the previous month, that emboldened rebels in Upper Canada to revolt.

The Upper Canada Rebellion was largely defeated shortly after it began, although resistance lingered until 1838. While it shrank, it became more violent, mainly through the support of the Hunters' Lodges, a secret United States-based militia that emerged around the Great Lakes, and launched the Patriot War in 1838.

Some historians suggest that although they were not directly successful or large, the rebellions in 1837 should be viewed in the wider context of the late-18th- and early-19th-century Atlantic Revolutions including the American Revolutionary War in 1776, the French Revolution of 1789–99, the Haitian Revolution of 1791–1804, the Irish Rebellion of 1798, and the independence struggles of Spanish America (1810–1825). While these rebellions differed in that they also struggled for republicanism, they were inspired by similar social problems stemming from poorly regulated oligarchies, and sought the same democratic ideals, which were also shared by the United Kingdom's Chartists.

The rebellion led directly to Lord Durham's Report on the Affairs of British North America, and to The British North America Act, 1840, which partially reformed the British provinces into a unitary system, leading to the formation of Canada as a nation in 1867.

Background

Political structure of Upper Canada

Many of the grievances which underlay the Rebellion involved the provisions of the Constitutional Act of 1791, which had created Upper Canada's political framework. 

The Family Compact dominated the government of Upper Canada and the financial and religious institutions associated with it. They were the leading members of the administration: executive councillors, legislative councillors, senior officials and some members of the judiciary. Their administrative roles were intimately tied to their business activities. For example, William Allan "was an executive councillor, a legislative councillor, President of the Toronto and Lake Huron Railroad, Governor of the British American Fire and Life Assurance Company and President of the Board of Trade." Members of the Family Compact utilized their official positions for monetary gain, especially through corporations such as the Bank of Upper Canada, and the two land companies (the Clergy Corporation and the Canada Company) that between them controlled two-sevenths of the land in the province. Lacking the minimum capital needed to found the bank, the corporate leaders persuaded the government to subscribe for a quarter of its shares. During the 1830s, a third of the bank's board were Legislative or Executive Councillors, and the remainder all magistrates. Despite repeated attempts, the elected Legislature – which had chartered the bank – could not obtain details on the bank's workings. Mackenzie saw the bank as a prop of the Government and demanded farmers withdraw the money they had deposited in the bank and public confidence in the bank decreased.

Demographic changes

The government of Upper Canada feared a growing interest in American-inspired republicanism in the province because of the increase in immigration of American settlers to the province. The large number of migrants led American legislators to speculate that bringing Upper Canada into the American fold would be a "mere matter of marching". After the War of 1812 the colonial government prevented Americans from swearing allegiance, thereby making them ineligible to obtain land grants. Relations between the appointed Legislative Council and the elected Legislative Assembly became increasingly strained in the years after the war, over issues of immigration, taxation, banking and land speculation.

Political unions

The Upper Canada Central Political Union was organized in 1832–33 by Thomas David Morrison and collected 19,930 signatures on a petition protesting William Lyon Mackenzie's expulsion from the House of Assembly. The Reformers won a majority in the elections held in 1834 for the Legislative Assembly of the 12th Parliament of Upper Canada but the Family Compact held the majority in the Legislative Council. The union was reorganized as the Canadian Alliance Society in 1835 and adopted much of the platform of the Owenite National Union of the Working Classes in London, England, that were to be integrated into the Chartist movement in England. In pursuit of this democratic goal, the Chartists eventually staged a similar armed rebellion, the Newport Rising, in Wales in 1839. The Canadian Alliance Society was reborn as the Constitutional Reform Society in 1836, and led by the more moderate reformer, William W. Baldwin. The Society took its final form as the Toronto Political Union in 1837 and they organized local "Vigilance Committees" to elect delegates to a Constitutional Convention in July 1837. This became the organizational structure for the Rebellion and most of the rebel organizers were elected Constitutional Convention delegates.

Francis Bond Head and the elections of 1836

Sir Francis Bond Head was appointed as Lieutenant-Governor and the Reform movement believed he would support their ideas. After meeting with Reformers, Bond Head concluded that they were disloyal to the British Empire and allied himself with the Family Compact. He refused proposals to bring responsible government to Upper Canada, responding in a sarcastic tone that belittled reformers. The Reform-dominated Assembly responded by refusing to pass the money bill, which halted the payment of salaries and pensions to many government workers. Bond Head then refused to pass any legislation from that government session including major public works projects. This caused a recession in Upper Canada. The movement was disappointed when Bond Head made it clear he had no intention of consulting the Executive Council in the daily operations of the administration. The Executive Council resigned, provoking widespread discontent and an election in 1834.

Unlike previous Lt. Governors, Bond Head actively supported Tory candidates and utilized Orange Order violence in order to ensure their election. He appealed to the people's desire to maintain part of the British Empire and a paternalistic attitude of the Crown providing goods for the people. Reformers such as Mackenzie and Samuel Lount lost their seats in the Legislature and they alleged that the election was fraudulent. They prepared a petition to the Crown protesting the abuses, carried to London by Charles Duncombe, but the Colonial Office refused to hear him. The new Tory-dominated Legislature passed laws that exacerbated tensions including continuing the Legislative session after the death of the King, prohibiting members of the Legislature from serving as Executive Councillors, making it easier to sue indebted farmers, protecting the Bank of Upper Canada from bankruptcy, and giving Legislative Councillors charters for their own banks.

Collapse of the international financial system

On July 10, 1832, US President Andrew Jackson vetoed the bill for the refinancing of the Second Bank of the United States, causing a depression in the Anglo-American world. This was worsened in Upper Canada by bad wheat harvests in 1836 and farmers were unable to pay their debts. Most banks – including the Bank of Upper Canada – suspended payments by July 1837 and successfully obtained government support while ordinary farmers and the poor did not. One fifth of British immigrants to Upper Canada were impoverished and most immigrant farmers lacked the capital to pay for purchased land. Debt collection laws allowed them to be jailed indefinitely until they paid their loans to merchants. In March 1837 the Tories passed a law making it cheaper to sue farmers by allowing city merchants to sue in the middle of harvest. If the farmer refused to come to court in Toronto, they would automatically forfeit the case and their property subjected to a sheriff's sale.

Among the more than 150 lawsuits they launched that year, the Bank of Upper Canada, sued Sheldon, Dutcher & Co., a foundry and Toronto's largest employer with over 80 employees in late 1836, bankrupting the company. Mackenzie's first plan for rebellion involved calling on Sheldon & Dutcher's men to storm the city hall, where the militia's guns were stored.

Budget of Upper Canada
The Reformers were incensed at the debt that the Family Compact incurred as the results of general improvements to the province, such as the Welland Canal. 

The Upper Canada legislature refused to pass a supply bill in 1836 after Bond Head refused to implement responsible government reforms. In retaliation Bond Head refused to sign any bills passed by the assembly, including public work projects. This contributed to economic hardship and increased unemployment throughout the province.

Planning

Mackenzie gathered reformers on July 28 and 31, 1837 to discuss their grievances with the government. The meeting created the Committee of Vigilance and signed a declaration urging every community to send delegates to a congress in Toronto and discuss remedies for their concerns. Mackenzie printed the declaration in his newspaper and toured communities north of Toronto to encourage citizens to make similar declarations. Farmers organised target practice sessions and forges in the Home District and Simcoe County created weapons for the rebellion.

On October 9, 1837, a messenger from the Patriotes informed Mackenzie that the rebellion in Lower Canada was going to begin. Mackenzie gathered reformers at John Doel's brewery and proposed kidnapping Bond Head, bringing him to city hall and forcing him to let the Legislature choose the members of the Executive Council. If Bond refused, they would declare independence from the British Empire. Reformers such as Thomas David Morrison opposed this plan and the meeting ended without consensus on what to do next.

The next day Mackenzie convinced John Rolph that a rebellion could be successful and happen without anyone being killed. Rolph convinced Morrison to support the rebellion but they also told Mackenzie to get confirmation of support from rural communities. Mackenzie sought out support in rural communities but he also proclaimed that an armed rebellion would happen on December 7 and assigned Samuel Lount and Anthony Anderson as commanders. Rolph and Morrison were reluctant about the plan so Mackenzie sought Anthony Van Egmond to help lead the armed forces.

In November 1837, in the lead-up to the Political Union's Constitutional Convention, Mackenzie published a satire in the Constitution, a round table discussion by John Locke, Benjamin Franklin, George Washington, Oliver Goldsmith and William Pitt and others. As part of this satire, he published a draft republican constitution for the State of Upper Canada that closely resembled the objectives in the constitution of the Canadian Alliance Society in 1834. Mackenzie printed broadsheets listing grievances and a call to arms to communities surrounding Toronto. Mackenzie also printed handbills declaring independence which were distributed to citizens north of Toronto.

Counter-rebellion planning

Bond Head did not believe the reports that stated the severity of resources and discontent gathered by the rebels. In November 1837, James Fitzgibbon was concerned about soldiers leaving Upper Canada going to quell the Lower Canada Rebellion and urged Bond Head to keep some troops for protection, which was refused. Fitzgibbon's call to arm a militia was also denied and he refused an armed guard at the Government's House and City Hall. After the Battle of Saint-Denis Fitzgibbon prepared a list of men that he could contact personally if a rebellion began in Toronto. The mayor of Toronto refused to ring the City Hall bell if a rebellion began because he felt Fitzgibbon was causing unnecessary concern over a possible revolt.

A Tory supporter obtained a copy of Mackenzie's declaration and showed it to authorities in Toronto. Government officials met at the Lieutenant Governor's residence on December 2 to discuss how to stop rumours of a rebellion. Fitzgibbon warned the men of rebels forging pikes north of the city and he was appointed adjutant general of the militia.

Confrontation

Toronto Rebellion

Rolph tried to warn Mackenzie about the warrant for his arrest but could not find him so delivered the message to Lount instead. Upon receiving Rolph's message Lount marched a group of rebels into Toronto for December 4. When hearing about this change, Mackenzie quickly tried to send a messenger to Lount to tell him not to arrive until December 7 but was unable to reach Lount in time. The men gathered at Montgomery's Tavern but were disappointed at the lack of preparation and the failure of the Lower Canada rebels. Although Lount wanted to launch an attack that night, other rebels leaders rejected that plan so that the troops could rest after their march and they could get information from Rolph about the status of rebels who lived in Toronto. 

A loyalist named Robert Moodie saw the large gathering at Montgomery's Tavern and rode towards Toronto to warn the officials. The rebels set up a roadblock south of the tavern on Yonge Street that Moodie tried riding through. He was wounded in an ensuing battle and taken to the tavern, where he died several hours later in severe pain. Another horseman saw the rebel's march into Toronto and notified Fitzgibbon, who tried unsuccessfully to have officials take action.

On December 4, Mackenzie and other rebels were patrolling the area and encountered Alderman John Powell and Archibald Macdonald. Mackenzie took both men prisoner but did not search them for weapons as they gave their word that they did not have any. As they were approaching Montgomery's Tavern Powell mortally shot Anthony Anderson in the neck and escaped back to Toronto to report to Bond Head. The rebel leaders met that night to discuss who would become the rebellion's leader after the death of Anderson and Lount's refusal to lead on his own. It was decided that Mackenzie would become the leader.

At noon on December 5, Mackenzie gathered the rebels and marched them towards Toronto. Meanwhile, Bond Head proposed a negotiating session with rebel leaders to Marshall Spring Bidwell, who declined. Bond Head then offered a negotiation with Rolph, who accepted. Rolph and Robert Baldwin met the rebel troops at Gallows Hill and stated the government's proposal of full amnesty to the rebels if they dispersed immediately. Lount and Mackenzie asked that this offer be presented in a written document and a convention be organised to discuss the province's policies. When Rolph and Baldwin returned to Bond Head, they were informed that the government's offer had been withdrawn. Rolph and Baldwin relayed the rejection to the rebels, and Rolph told Mackenzie that they should attack as soon as possible because the city was poorly defended. Instead, Mackenzie spent the day burning down the house of Bank of Upper Canada official and questioning the loyalty of his troops.

A few hours later Rolph sent a messenger to Mackenzie that Toronto rebels were ready for their arrival to the city and Mackenzie marched his troops towards Toronto. A group of twenty-six men led by Samuel Jarvis met the rebels on their march and fired upon them before running away. The rebels believed there were several battalions of troops firing upon them and several ran away. Lount encouraged some riflemen to return fire before realising that the enemy had left the battlefield. Lount and the riflemen marched to find the rebels who fled and found Mackenzie trying to convince the rebels to continue their path towards Toronto. The rebels refused to march until daylight.

On Tuesday night MacNab arrived in Toronto with sixty men from the Hamilton area. Morrison was arrested and charged with treason while Rolph sent a letter encouraging Mackenzie to send the rebels home then fled to the United States. Mackenzie ignored the letter and continued his plan for rebellion. 

On Wednesday morning  Peter Matthews arrived at the tavern with sixty men, but Mackenzie could still not convince the rebel forces to march towards Toronto. Instead, they decided to wait for Anthony Van Egmond to lead the rebellion into Toronto. The rebels raided a mail coach, stole the passenger's money and looked for information about the progress of the rebellion in London, Upper Canada. Mackenzie also attacked other travellers and robbed them or questioned them about the revolt.

The government organised a council of war and agreed to attack the rebels on December 7. Fitzgibbon was appointed commander of the government's forces. Although initially believing the government's position was untenable he was inspired by a company of men that formed to defend the government. At noon Bond Head ordered that the troops, consisting of 1200 men and two cannons, march towards the rebels.

Battle of Montgomery's Tavern

Anthony Van Egmond arrived at the tavern on December 7 and encouraged the rebel leaders to disperse, as he felt the rebellion would not be a success. His advice was rejected, so he proposed entrenching and defending their position at the tavern. Mackenzie disagreed and wanted to attack the government troops. They agreed to send sixty men to the Don Bridge to divert government troops. That afternoon a sentinel reported the government force's arrival from Gallows Hill. At this point only 200 men at Montgomery's Tavern were armed. The armed forces were split into two companies and went to fields on both sides of Yonge Street. The rebels without arms were sent to the tavern with their prisoners.

The government forces also split into two companies when the rebels fired upon them. The rebels dispersed in a panic after the first round of firing thinking the rebel's front row had been killed when they were simply dropping to the ground to allow those behind them to fire. The government continued their march and at Montgomery's Tavern a cannon shot into the dining room window. The rebels fled north and the morale of the rebellion was irreparably broken. Bond Head ordered the tavern to be burned down and the rebels arrested.

London Rebellion
News of the intended rebellion had reached London, Upper Canada and its surrounding townships by December 7. It was initially thought that the Toronto rebellion was successful, contributing to Charles Duncombe wanting to rise up as well. Upon hearing more details about the rebellion in Toronto, Duncombe convened a series of public meetings to spread news of the supposed atrocities committed by Bond Head against all suspected reformers to help increase anti-government support. It is estimated that there were between 400 and 500 rebels who assembled under Duncombe.

Colonel Allan MacNab, who had just finished leading Upper Canadian militiamen during the Battle of Montgomery's Tavern, was sent to engage Duncombe's uprising. He left Hamilton, Ontario on December 12 and arrived in Brantford on December 13. Although many rebels, including Duncombe, had fled prior to the upcoming battle due to hearing about the failure of Mackenzie in Toronto and general disorganization, there were still some present in Scotland, Ontario and MacNab commenced his attack on Scotland on December 14, causing the remaining rebels to flee after only a few shots were fired. The victorious Tory supporters burned homes and farms of known rebels and suspected supporters. In the 1860s, some of the former rebels were compensated by the Canadian government for their lost property in the rebellion aftermath.

Patriot war

The rebels from Toronto travelled to the United States in groups of two. Mackenzie, Duncombe, Rolph and 200 supporters fled to Navy Island in the Niagara River and declared themselves the Republic of Canada on December 13. They obtained supplies from supporters in the United States, resulting in British reprisals (see Caroline affair). On January 13, 1838, under attack by British armaments, the rebels fled. Mackenzie went to the United States mainland where he was arrested for violating the Neutrality Act. 

The rebels continued their raids into Canada using the U.S. as a base of operations and, in cooperation with the U.S. Hunters' Lodges, dedicated themselves to the overthrow of British rule in Canada. The raids did not end until the rebels and Hunters were defeated at the Battle of the Windmill, just eleven months after the initial battle at Montgomery's Tavern.

Consequences: execution or transportation

The British government was concerned about the rebellion, especially in light of the strong popular support for the rebels in the United States and the Lower Canada Rebellion. Bond Head was recalled in late 1837 and replaced with Sir George Arthur who arrived in Toronto in March 1838. Parliament also sent Lord Durham to become Governor-in-Chief of the British North American colonies, so that Arthur reported to Durham. Durham was assigned to report on the grievances among the British North American colonists and find a way to appease them. His report eventually led to greater autonomy in the Canadian colonies and the union of Upper and Lower Canada into the Province of Canada in 1840.

Over 800 people were arrested after the rebellion for being Reform sympathisers. Van Egmond died of an illness he acquired while imprisoned while Lount and Peter Matthews were sentenced to the gallows for leading the rebellion. Other rebels were also sentenced to hang and ninety-two men were sent to Van Diemen's Land. A group of rebels escaped their prison at Fort Henry and travelled to the United States. A general pardon for everyone but Mackenzie was issued in 1845, and Mackenzie himself was pardoned in 1849 and allowed to return to Canada, where he resumed his political career.

Historical significance

John Charles Dent, writing in 1885, said the rebellion was a reaction from the public of the government mismanagement of the minority ruling elite. Frederick Armstrong believed the rebellion was a reaction to patronage afforded to members of the Family Compact after winning the 1836 election. Dent wrote that the rebellion caused England to notice the concerns of Canadian reformers and reconsider their colonial rule of the province. He thought the rebellion hastened the changes Reformers advocated by drawing attention to the province from the Colonial Office and the production of the Durham Report.

Paul Romney explains this failure of historical imagination as the outcome of an explicit strategy adopted by reformers in the face of charges of disloyalty to Britain in the wake of the Rebellions of 1837. In recounting the “myths of responsible government”, Romney emphasized that after the ascendancy of Loyalism as the dominant political ideology of Upper Canada any demand for democracy or for responsible government became a challenge to colonial sovereignty. The linkage of the "fight for responsible government" with disloyalty was solidified by the Rebellion of 1837, as reformers took up arms to finally break the "baneful domination" of the mother country. Struggling to avoid the charge of sedition, reformers later purposefully obscured their true aims of independence from Britain and focused on their grievances against the Family Compact. Thus, responsible government became a "pragmatic" policy of alleviating local abuses, rather than a revolutionary anti-colonial moment.

William Kilbourn stated that the removal of Radicals from Upper Canada politics, either through execution or their retreat to the United States, allowed the Clear Grits to be formed as a more moderate political force that had fewer disagreements with the Tories than the reformers.

See also

 Benjamin Milliken II
 History of Canada
 List of conflicts in Canada
 Rebellions of 1837

References

Works cited

Further reading
 William Lyon Mackenzie, Dictionary of Canadian Biography Online, Biographi.ca
 "Rebellion in Upper Canada, 1837" by J. Edgar Rea "MHS Transactions: Rebellion in Upper Canada, 1837" Mhs.mb.ca
 Brown, Richard. Rebellion in Canada, 1837-1885: Autocracy, Rebellion and Liberty (Volume 1) (2012)         excerpt volume 1; Rebellion in Canada, 1837-1885, Volume 2: The Irish, the Fenians and the Metis (2012)  excerpt for volume 2
 Ducharme, Michel. "Closing the Last Chapter of the Atlantic Revolution: The 1837-38 Rebellions in Upper and Lower Canada,"  Proceedings of the American Antiquarian Society  116(2): 413–430; (2006)
 Dunning, Tom. "The Canadian Rebellions of 1837 and 1838 as a Borderland War: A Retrospective," Ontario History (2009) 101#2 pp 129–141.
 Mann, Michael. A Particular Duty: The Canadian Rebellions, 1837-1839 (1986)
 Read, Colin. The rebellion of 1837 in Upper Canada (The Canadian Historical Association historical booklet) (1988), short pamphlet
 Tiffany, Orrin Edward. The Relations of the United States to the Canadian Rebellion of 1837-1838 (2010)
  "The story of the Upper Canadian rebellion". C. Blackett Robinson, Toronto
 Charles Lindsey, The Life and Times of William Lyon Mackenzie and the Rebellion of 1837–38. 1862; cited by Betsy Dewar Boyce, The Rebels of Hastings, 1992.

Primary sources
 Proceedings of the Legislative Council of Upper Canada on the bill sent up from the House of Assembly, entitled, An act to amend the jury laws of this province (February 25, 1836)
 Colin Read and Ronald J. Stagg, eds. The Rebellion of 1837 in Upper Canada: A collection of documents (The Publications of the Champlain Society, Ontario Series XII, 1985), 471pp (with free online access).
  Greenwood,F. Murray, and  Barry Wright (2 vol 1996, 2002) Canadian state trials – Rebellion and invasion in the Canadas, 1837–1839  Society for Canadian Legal History by University of Toronto Press,

External links

 The History of the Battle of Toronto by William Lyon Mackenzie, 1839 from the Ontario Time Machine
 Samuel Lount Film and Samuel Lount's History. The feature film is about the injustice of the system under the Family Compact's rule.
 "Mr. Jarvis, do your duty". by Serge Gorelsky
 "Upper canada rebellion". www.canadianencyclopedia.ca

 
Political history of Canada
December 1837 events